"You Really Know How to Hurt a Guy" is a song whose music was composed by Jan Berry, Jill Gibson, and Roger Christian, which was recorded by 1960s American pop singers, Jan and Dean. The song was recorded and released as a single and then appeared on the 1965 album Jan & Dean Golden Hits, Volume 2. The B-side of the single is "It's As Easy As 1,2,3." "You Really Know How to Hurt A Guy" reached up to number 27 on the Billboard Hot 100 on July 10, 1965, which was their highest-charting single of the year on the U.S. Billboard Hot 100, by edging "I Found a Girl" which charted at number 30 later in 1965. Jan and Dean were known for their music of the 1960s surf era with songs like "Dead Man's Curve," "Drag City," and "The Little Old Lady from Pasadena." This single marked the beginning of Jan & Dean getting away from their Surfing roots that they were known for.

Charts

References 

1965 songs
1965 singles
Jan and Dean songs
Songs written by Roger Christian (songwriter)
Liberty Records singles
Songs written by Jan Berry